Reset is the tenth studio album released by Australian singer and songwriter Tina Arena on 18 October 2013. The first single, "You Set Fire to My Life" was released on 26 September 2013. Despite not being released as a single, "Only Lonely" charted in the top 50 in late November due to being used in an advertisement for the Australian soap opera Home and Away. "Reset All" was released as the second official single on 18 December. Reset is Arena's sixth top 10 album in Australia. Reset was released in the United Kingdom on 3 November 2014.

Singles
"You Set Fire to My Life" was released at the first single in September 2013 and peaked at 38.
"Reset All" was released as the second single and "Love You Less" was announced as the third single in March 2014, but did not eventuate. "Still Running" was released as the third single in August 2014. The video clip was filmed in Rome and released in July.

In addition to the official singles, "Only Lonely" charted at 32 and gained national interest after it was used in a commercial for the 2013 finale of Channel 7's Home and Away as well as at the 2014 Logie Awards.

On 19 February 2014, Arena released remixes of "Don't Hide", which were used in promotion of the 2014 Sydney Mardi Gras.

Track listing

Charts

Weekly charts

Year-end charts

Certifications

Tour

On 9 March 2014, Arena announced the 13-date Reset All Tour. 6 shows were added, and the Hobart show was removed, taking the total to 18. The support act was George Perris.

Set list 
This set list consists of 18 songs and is representative of the 1st show in Adelaide. It does not represent all concerts for the duration of the tour.

"Let Me In"
"Out of the Blue"
"Soul Mate #9"
"Dare You to Be Happy"
"Sorrento Moon (I Remember)" 
"Still Running"
"Don't Look Back"
"Destination Unknown" 
"Only Lonely" 
"Reset All" 
"Don't Hide" 
"Never (Past Tense)"
"Burn"
"Symphony of Life"
"Heaven Help My Heart"

Encore
 "Chains"
 "I Need Your Body"
 "You Set Fire To My Life"

References

Tina Arena albums
2013 albums
EMI Records albums